The List of military equipment of Croatia is an alphabetical listing of all types used by or produced in Croatia since independence in 1991.

A 

 Agram 2000/2002:  9 mm weapon made in Croatia.
 APS-95:  5.56 mm rifle made in Croatia.
 AT-4 Spigot,  Antitank missile from the Soviet Union.
 AT-7 Saxhorn,  Antitank missile from the Soviet Union.

B 

 BOV,  light armored vehicle from Yugoslavia.
 BRDM-2,  reconnaissance vehicle from the Soviet Union.
 BTR-50,  armored personnel carrier from the Soviet Union.
 BTR-60,  armored personnel carrier from the Soviet Union.

C 

 Commando 60 mm mortar,  Croatian mortar.

D 

 Dragon Skin Body Armor -Ballistic vest

E 

 EM-992,  Croatian sniper rifle version of the .300 Winchester Magnum.
 Ero,  Croatian variant of the Uzi.

F 

 FN-FAL,  Assault rifle from Belgium.

G 

 G-2 Galeb,  light combat aircraft from Yugoslavia (withdrawn).
 G36,  Assault rifle from Germany.
 Gorenje,  .22 cal pistol of Yugoslav origin.

H 

 HS2000, Croatian-made 9 mm pistol

I 

 Ingram MAC-10,  .45 cal submachine gun of United States origin.
 Iveco LMV

J 

 J-21 Jastreb,  light combat aircraft from Yugoslavia (withdrawn).

K 

 Konkurs,  Antitank missile from the Soviet Union.

L 

 LOV-1

M 

 M2HB Browning,  .50 cal machine gun of United States origin.
 M49,  7.62 mm of Yugoslav origin (withdrawn).
 M52 P2/P3 hand grenade Yugoslav hand grenade, defensive
 M56 Submachine gun,  7.62 mm of Yugoslav origin.
 M56 howitzer,  copy of the M101A1.
 M59 rifle, copy of Soviet SKS.
 M59/66,  improved version of basic M59 (reserve).
 M60 rifle grenade
 M60 recoilless gun, 82 mm recoilless gun from Yugoslavia.
 OT M-60,  armored personnel carrier built in Yugoslavia.
 M61 Skorpion,  7.65 mm automatic pistol of Czechoslovakian origin.
 M68 mortar, 81 mm mortar from Yugoslavia.
 M69A, 82 mm mortar from Yugoslavia.
 M74 mortar, 120 mm mortar from Yugoslavia.
 M75 hand grenade, Yugoslav hand grenade, offensive
 M75 mortar, 120 mm mortar built in Yugoslavia and Croatia.
 Zastava M76, sniper rifle of Yugoslav origin.
 M79 anti-tank grenade, Yugoslav anti-tank grenade, copy of the Russian RKG-3 
 M79, 82 mm recoilless rifle from Yugoslavia.
 M79 Osa, 90 mm antitank weapon from Yugoslavia.
 BVP M-80, armored personnel carrier built in Yugoslavia (modernized).
 M80 Zolja,  64 mm antitank weapon from Yugoslavia.
 M-83 (vehicle), antitank vehicle from Yugoslavia.
 M84 machine gun, copy of Soviet PK machine gun.
 M-84,  main battle tank built in Yugoslavia and Croatia (modernized).
 M85, copy of Soviet AKSU-74 assault rifle.
 M86 machine gun, copy of Soviet PKT machine gun.
 M87 machine gun, copy of Soviet NSVT machine gun.
 M87 Topaz, 100 mm antitank gun from Yugoslavia.
 M90, 120 mm antitank weapon from Yugoslavia.
 M90 mortar, 60 mm mortar from Yugoslavia.
 M93 hand grenade, Macedonian hand grenade
 M-93 mortar, 82 mm mortar built in Croatia.
 M-95 Degman, new main battle tank.
 M-96 mortar, 82 mm mortar built in Croatia.
 M-98 Jelen, Croatian weapon, sniper.
 M1919A4 Browning,  7.62 mm machine gun of United States origin.
 M1948, 76 mm field gun from the Soviet Union.
 9M14 Malyutka, antitank missile of Soviet origin.
 MiG-21, light fighter of Soviet design.
 MILAN, Antitank missile from France.
 Mini Ero, Small version of the Ero.
 MP5, 9 mm submachine gun of German origin.
 MT-12 Rapira, 100 mm antitank gun from the Soviet Union.
 MT-LB, armored carrier from the Soviet Union.

P 

 Patria AMV, 8x8 Armored personnel carrier. 280 may be planned.

R 

 R4,  5.56 mm assault rifle from South Africa.
 RBG-6,  40 mm grenade launcher.
 RL90 M95,  copy of the M79 rocket launcher.
 RPG-7,  rocket propelled grenade of Soviet origin.
 RT-20,  20 mm tactical sniper rifle, anti-materiel rifle.

S 

 SOKO J-22 Orao, Sub-sonic ground attack jet.

T 

 T-12 antitank gun, 100 mm antitank gun of Soviet origin (in reserve).
 T-34-85, medium tank of Soviet origin (withdrawn).
 T-55, medium tank of Soviet origin (built in Poland, reserve).
 T-72, main battle tank of Soviet origin (modernized).
 Thompson, .45 cal submachine gun of United States origin (withdrawn).

U 

 UBM-52,  120 mm mortar from Yugoslavia.
 Uzi,  9 mm submachine gun of Israeli origin.
 Ultimax 100, 5.56 mm MG with 100-round drum magazine, from Singapore.

V 

 VHS Assault Rifle Croatian service rifle

Z 

 ZIS-3,  76.2 mm field gun from the Soviet Union.

See also 
 List of equipment of the Croatian Army
 List of active Croatian Navy ships
 List of equipment of the Croatian Air Force
 Lists of military equipment

Equipment
Croatia